James C. Brown (July 2, 1868 – April 17, 1937) was an Ontario farmer and political figure. He represented Middlesex North in the Legislative Assembly of Ontario from 1919 to 1923 as a United Farmers of Ontario member.

He was born in East Williams Township, Middlesex County, Ontario, the son of William Brown and Fanny McMurry. In 1891, he married Christina McKellar. He was also president and director for the local telephone company. Brown lived near Parkhill. He died in 1937.

References

 Canadian Parliamentary Guide, 1922, EJ Chambers

External links

1868 births
1937 deaths
United Farmers of Ontario MLAs